Sir David Orme Masson KBE FRS FRSE LLD (13 January 1858 – 10 August 1937) was a scientist born in England who emigrated to Australia to become Professor of Chemistry at the University of Melbourne. He is known for his work on the explosive compound nitroglycerin.

Early life
Masson was born in Hampstead (near London), the only son and second child of Emily Rosaline née Orme (she was the younger sister of Eliza Orme, the first Englishwoman to receive a law degree) and her husband, David Mather Masson, Professor of English Literature at University College London. His father later became Professor of Rhetoric and English Literature at the University of Edinburgh in 1865.

Masson was educated at Oliphant's School in Edinburgh (1865–68), the Edinburgh Academy and then the University of Edinburgh, where he graduated MA in 1877. He studied chemistry under Alexander Crum Brown (BSc 1880). He then studied under Friedrich Wöhler at Göttingen in 1879 before obtaining a position with William Ramsay at Bristol, with whom he did research work on phosphorus. Masson returned to the University of Edinburgh in 1881 with a Research Scholarship for three years, obtaining his D.Sc. degree in 1884. Masson was involved in the founding of the Student Representative Council. His research during this period included investigations in the preparation and properties of nitroglycerin (glyceryl trinitrate).

In 1885 he was elected a Fellow of the Royal Society of Edinburgh. His proposers were Alexander Crum Brown, Arthur Mitchell, John Murray, and Peter Guthrie Tait.

On 5 August 1886, Masson married Mary Struthers, daughter of John Struthers, in Aberdeen.

Career in Australia
In October 1886 Masson arrived with his new wife in Australia to take up the position as Professor of Chemistry at the University of Melbourne. His inaugural lecture was given on 23 March 1887, titled "The Scope and Aim of Chemical Science". Though there were few students in chemistry, the laboratory equipment was inadequate even for them, and one of his first tasks was to prepare plans for a new laboratory and lecture theatre. There was a steady growth of students and, as the staff was small, Masson was much occupied with teaching work for many years, but still found some time for research.

In 1912 Masson became President of the Professorial Board, undertaking work that would be done today by a paid Vice-Chancellor, as well as scientific work in connection with World War I.

In 1915 he was asked by the Prime Minister of Australia W. M. Hughes to act as Chairman of a Committee to draw up a scheme for a Commonwealth Institute of Science and Industry, but difficulties arose and it was not until 1920 that the Institute was established. In 1926 it became the Council for Scientific and Industrial Research, of which Masson was a member until his death.

Masson participated in the organisation of Douglas Mawson's expedition to the Antarctic in 1911–14, supporting his interest in the Australasian Association for the Advancement of Science, of which he was President 1911–1913. He was Chairman of the Organizing Committee of the British Association meeting in Australia in 1914. Masson was offered a professorship at University College, London, in 1913, but he refused the appointment.

Masson was elected a Fellow of the Royal Society, London, in 1903.

He was created CBE in 1918 and KBE in 1922.

He founded both the Melbourne University Chemical Society and the Society of Chemical Industry of Victoria.

He was the first president of the Australian Chemical Institute (1917–20).

With Edgeworth David, he co-founded the Australian National Research Council, and was its president in 1922–1926.

Late life
At the end of 1923 Masson retired from his chair at Melbourne and became professor emeritus. After his resignation he continued his interest in the progress of chemical science, and sat on several councils and committees. Masson died of cancer in South Yarra, Melbourne on 10 August 1937.

He was survived by his wife, daughter and son. Lady Masson did valuable work during World War I, and was created CBE in 1918. The son, James Irvine Orme Masson, born at Melbourne in 1887, had a distinguished academic career, becoming Vice-Chancellor of the University of Sheffield in 1938, and elected a Fellow of the Royal Society in 1939. Masson published Three Centuries of Chemistry in 1925. A daughter, Flora Marjorie (later Mrs W. E. Bassett), published in 1940, The Governor's Lady, and another daughter, Elsie Rosaline (d. 1935), who married the distinguished anthropologist, Bronislaw Malinowski, was also a writer; she published An Untamed Territory in 1915.

Among his students were David Rivett who succeeded him in his chair, and Ernst Hartung who followed Rivett. Bertram Dillon Steele and Herbert Gepp were also his students.

References

Bibliography
 Masson of Melbourne, The Life and Times of David Orme Masson, Len Weickhardt, Royal Australian Chemical Institute, 1989.

1858 births
1937 deaths
People educated at Edinburgh Academy
Alumni of the University of Edinburgh
Australian Knights Commander of the Order of the British Empire
English emigrants to colonial Australia
Australian chemists
Fellows of the Royal Society
Academic staff of the University of Melbourne
English people of Scottish descent
Australian people of Scottish descent